Haxhi Zeka University is a public university located in Peja, Kosovo.

History of the institution 
Haxhi Zeka University is a successor to the Faculty of Applied Business Sciences (FABS) in Peja, founded in 1960 with the decision of the executive council of KSAK as the High Commercial and Commercial School in Peja. Initially, the school had only the Commercial Business Unit in the Enterprise and a small number of teachers. In the first year of study 1960/61 120 students were registered. Since then, the school has engaged in the training of economists' professional cadres that respond to social and economic conditions. The activity and development of the Higher School of Economics was always oriented to building that kind of regular curriculum that would form economists with contemporary professional skills that would respond to the needs of economic development and business in general.
From the High School of Economics came several thousand economists from Kosovo and other ethnic Albanian territories (Macedonia, Montenegro, Serbia, etc.). This number of economists best expresses the contribution of the school they gave to the economy of Kosovo and all Albanian territory. The High School of Economics in Peja experienced some very interesting and important existential periods of time.
These periods can be divided as follows: 1960–1974 – period of formation and establishment of institutional identity 1975–1990 – period of affirmation of the school in Kosovo and all other places around Kosovo, 1991–1999 – survival period, through continuity of continuity through the parallel organization of learning in private homes 2000–2006 – the reorganization period of the FASB. In the academic year 2001/2002.
The High School of Economics was reformed according to the Bologna Declaration model and this year the Senate of the University of Prishtina approved the curricula according to this statement for the bachelor level. This school was renamed at the Business School and then at the Faculty of Applied Business Sciences. During the organization of FASB, named Business School, the studies were conducted in three departments: Business Administration, Informatics applied in Business and Management in Tourism and Catering. In 2002, Bosnian-language studies were organized in the Business Administration department. Since 2004, the Faculty of Applied Sciences in Business has been named by the Faculty of Applied Sciences in Business. 2007 – ... – since 2007 in FSHAB the studies are conducted in three departments: Business Administration Department in both Albanian and Bosnian languages, Department of Accountancy and Business Finances and Management and Tourism Management Department. In March 2009, ACAA is accredited by the Agency for Accreditation in all the curricula it offers today. The Faculty of Applied Business Sciences, based in Peja, is a provider of basic and other studies stipulated by the Law on Higher Education and the Statute of the University of Pristina.
Regular and part-time studies at the Faculty of Applied Business in Peja are organized for obtaining the academic Bachelor of Science degree. Based on the Statute of the University of Pristina, the Faculty of Applied Sciences has the right to organize studies for the academic preparation of the Master of Science and in this context the FABS is preparing for the development of master programs so that in it The future will also offer this cycle of studies. As far as the Business Administration conducted in the Bachelor level and not in the Master level, the vast majority of the teachers perform their scientific activity outside the faculty through counseling, congresses, seminars, various conferences in home and abroad.
Faculty of Applied Business Sciences FABS has cooperation with numerous organizations and programs offered by international organizations such as TEMPUS where we have had 6 years of cooperation in sending academic staff to England, Slovenia, Sweden and other countries participating in this program. KFOR faculty cooperation is in continuous process where almost all the researches and activities organized by KFOR in Peja town are conducted in cooperation with FABS. At the moment we had visiting professors from universities outside Kosovo, from the region, from England University of Staffordshire, from Sweden Vaxio University, from Italy University of Trentos. Persistent collaborations with Bosnian universities, as well as the professors of various Bosnian universities, are professors engaged in Bosnian language. During the academic year 2009–10, there were engaged teachers in regular working relationships in this composition: 10 science teachers, 8 science teachers and bachelor preparatory courses 2 teachers. Whereas, as a committed teacher there is the following composition: 23 science teachers, 7 science teachers and bachelor preparatory courses 3 teachers.
So far at the bachelor's level at the Faculty of Applied Business Sciences have graduated 1050 students, whereas in the former High School of Economics since 1960 they have graduated a total of 2,868 students in Albanian. In this academic year, the Faculty of Applied Business Science has 2210 students. FSHAB is led by Enver Beqiri, Salih Lika, Ali Sylqa, Mehdi Gjakova, Edmond Beqiri, Xhevat Bakraçi, and Armand Krasniqi.
For the establishment of Haxhi Zeka University in Peja, the following decision has been made:  • Pursuant to Article 145 (point 2) of the Constitution of the Republic of Kosovo, taking into account Articles 4, 21, 22 of Law no. 03 / L-189 on the state administration of the Republic of Kosovo (Official Gazette No. 82, 21 October 2010) and based on Article 8 paragraph 1.4 and the Annex to Regulation No. 02/2011 on the areas of administrative responsibility of the Office of the Prime Minister and ministries (22.03.2011), Article 9, paragraphs 1 and 10 and paragraph 1 of the Law on Higher Education (Official Gazette No. 14.9, September 2011) has issued:  • DECISION – Public University "Haxhi Zeka" is established in Peja as an educational and research institution, which holds degrees and degrees until the doctoral level. The MEST bodies are obliged to make all the necessary preparations for the establishment and functioning of the Public University "Haxhi Zeka" in Peja. The decision enters into force on the day of signing.  • REASONING – Given the abovementioned provisions and the need to include the largest number of students in higher education with the aim of:  • Progress in the field of academic knowledge in Kosovo, in the region and most of all;  • Educational, scientific, cultural, social and economic development of Kosovo;  • Development of professional skills and high competencies, and  • Promoting democratic citizenship and achieving the highest levels of teaching and learning were decided in the enacting clause of this decision.

Organisation 
On November 11, 2012, the Parliament of Kosovo in its regular session has ratified the establishment of the Public University "Haxhi Zeka" Peja. The first generation of students has enrolled, in October 2012. Public University "Haxhi Zeka" is founded as a public institution of higher education. Now it consists of the following faculties:

Faculties 
Faculty of Business (Albanian and Bosnian)-The Faculty of Business is a legitimate successor and legatee of the Faculty of Applied Business Science at the University of Prishtina – a faculty who was the heir of the Business School in Peja and the High School of Economics, founded in 1960 as an independent institution of named the High Commercial and Commercial High School in Peja. In the academic year 2001/2002, the High School of Economics was reformed according to the Bologna Declaration model and in this year the Senate of the University of Prishtina approved the curriculum according to this declaration for the Bachelor level. This school was renamed at the Business School, then at the Faculty of Applied Science Business and later under UP Senate decision no. ref. 3/914 of the 27.10.2010 at the Faculty of Business. The Business Faculty of "Haxhi Zeka" University, with its headquarters in Peja, is a provider of basic, master and other studies stipulated by the Law on Higher Education and the Statute of UHZ. Regular and part-time studies at the Faculty of Business in Peja are organized for obtaining the Bachelor and Master Academic Preparation. The Faculty of Business consists of three departments. In all three departments are offered bachelor and master studies. The studies offered are:  Bachelor studies:  Business Administration(Albanian)  Business Administration (Bosnian Language) and  Accounting and finance  Master of Studies:  Business Administration  Business Administration (Bosnian language)  Accounting and Finance and  Human resource Management
Law Faculty The Law Faculty in Peja has started working as a branch of the Faculty of Law of the University of Prishtina in the academic year 2010/2011 based on the decision of the managing bodies of the UP. The preparatory work together with the management of the Faculty of Applied Business Sciences (FASB) started in June 2010 after the announcement of the admission contest for students in this branch. Until the beginning of the learning process, lesson rooms and other accompanying infrastructure were prepared. The lesson started to take place on: October 1, 2010 and the academic part was organized by the management of this institution while the logistics and infrastructural part from the management of FASB. The branch of the Law Faculty in Peja, as well as the center in Pristina, the responsible structures have been approached seriously by applying the same standards that have been interlinked for an intensive process of legal education reform in accordance with the most advanced standards European and international higher education. Over the last two years, efforts have been made and major steps towards applying the Bologna system for Higher Education and continuous progress has been made in the area of quality assurance of teaching, learning and assessment of the knowledge of the studies and in many the field of law and legal education in this institution, including radical changes to curricula in accordance with the legislation in force in the Republic of Kosovo and in accordance with the most advanced European and international higher education standards. Transformation of the Law Faculty branch from the University of Prishtina into academic units – Law Faculty within the Public University "Haxhi Zeka" in the legal plan is enabled by the Decision of the Steering Council of the UP and by the Tripartite Agreement of Understanding. This process of legal transformation has been followed with special care by not creating any situation or vacuum in the curriculum implementation plan which, even earlier and now, has the aim of adequately educating and professionalizing younger generations of lawyers Providing them with knowledge, experience and development of analytical, theoretical and practical skills and skills necessary to practice the profession of lawyer in practice. The Faculty of Law will coordinate with the Law Faculty programs of the University of Prishtina in particular with the study programs that will be offered by the Summer and Winter University to experience the diversity of academic programs and the international study environment. The conditions for studying at the Law Faculty of Public University "Haxhi Zeka" in Peja are optimal and there are more choices for teaching subjects during the teaching process as well as for other research and educational activities. However, given the general conditions of higher education in Kosovo, limited opportunities for substantial investment in improving overall infrastructure and sufficient staffing levels, as well as ongoing demands for student numbers increase, the process of reforming the legal education towards improving the quality and quality of teaching, learning and evaluating student knowledge in this institution are a continuous process towards the realization of its mission.
Faculty of Management in tourism, catering and environment. The Faculty of Tourism, Hospitality and Environment Management (FMTHM) is the successor of the Tourism Management and Hospitality Management department (1969–1975), which has been part of the High School of Economics. This school was established in 1960 as a two-year Higher Education Institution. In the academic year 2001/2002, the High School of Economics was reformed according to the Bologna Declaration model and this year the Senate of the University of Prishtina approved the curricula according to this statement for the bachelor level. This school was renamed at the Business School and then at the Faculty of Applied Business Sciences. But in this period 2001/2002, the Management and Tourism Department re-opened, which continues to function today as the faculty itself. The Faculty of Tourism, Hospitality and Public Management of the Public University "Haxhi Zeka" Peja (UPP), is a provider of basic and other studies stipulated by the Law on Higher Education and the UPP Statute. Regular and part-time studies at FMTHM in Peja are organized for the acquisition of academic Bachelor of Science degree in science. FMTHM has a complete staff of 27 teachers operating with these capacities: 1852 students, with a general and complete, ready-to-work administration, room for learning, with temporary structures created and well-designed teaching programs and learning.                                                                                                                                                                                                        Vision The Faculty of Tourism, Hotel and Environment Management aims to become a contemporary university education university, postgraduate, research and training for the preparation of specialists in the field of tourism, catering and the environment. The Faculty of Tourism, Hotel and Environment Management with a department, a program and two study profiles, aims to become a reference point for the development of tourism, catering and environment frameworks, contributing directly to the European integration of the country.
Faculty of agribusiness The Faculty of Agribusiness is the academic unit of the Public University "Haxhi Zeka" Peja since 2012 It is treated as a public institution of higher education, which currently organizes and develops undergraduate studies and claims that in the future, after graduating the first generation, continue with advanced level studies by enabling new professional and scientific cadres. The faculty is located in Peja, specifically in the building of the former military garrison (KSF). This academic unit uses a part of this building (the second floor where there are four lecture halls, and an amphitheater when needed) while the exercises are held in IBK premises. The laboratories are of regional and European level with good conditions and other spaces that are linked to the university library.  At present, the spaces are adequate and sufficient to withstand the actual number of students. However, the Administration and Dean's Office segments have also created that guarantee a quality and effective management process at the institution.  We note that in the near future we will work towards the completion of the library both in the spatial plan and in the enrichment of the book fund. Professionally speaking, the space for this faculty is sufficient for this stage of study but not for future goals.  The learning process takes place in the part of the spaces that are given in the central self-assessment report. Based on the number of students and available space, each student in the faculty averages over 2 m², which is in line with the required standards.
Faculty of arts The Faculty of Arts is the academic unit of the Public University "Haxhi Zeka" Peja. Since 2012, it has been treated as a public institution of education or polytechnic studies, which currently organizes and develops undergraduate-Bachelor studies and claims that in the future, to pursue advanced studies, post-graduate studies by enabling staff new professional and artistic in the Music Laminate. The first generation of the Faculty of Arts, counts altogether 40 regular students], who are expected to graduate in 2016.  Regular studies at the Faculty of Arts in Peja are organized for obtaining the Bachelor of Arts Academy and lasting four years. Meanwhile, six full-time teachers are engaged in the teaching process and four are complementary and engaged.  Currently, the Faculty of Arts consists of two departments. Both departments offer four-year Bachelor studies.  The directions provided in the music sheet are:  1. General Music Education  2. Music education  3. Artistic education in breathing instruments.
Also, the university provides opportunities for academic preparation master of science.

See also 
 Education in Peja
 University of Pristina

Notes

References

External links 
 www.unhz.eu 
 sems.unhz.eu

Universities in Kosovo
Peja